Senator Kavanagh or Kavanaugh may refer to:

Brian P. Kavanagh (born 1967), New York State Senate
Edward Kavanagh (1795–1844), Maine State Senate
John Kavanagh (Arizona politician) (born 1950), Arizona State Senate
Frederick W. Kavanaugh (1871–1940), New York State Senate
Walter J. Kavanaugh (1933–2008), New Jersey State Senate
William Marmaduke Kavanaugh (1866–1915), U.S. Senator from Arkansas

See also
Senator Cavanaugh (disambiguation)